Masha Lubelsky (born 25 December 1936) is an Israeli former politician who served as a member of the Knesset for the Labor Party between 1992 and 1996.

Biography
Born in Herzliya during the Mandate era, Lubelsky worked in education. She served as secretary general of Na'amat from 1981 until 1992, and was a member of the Histadrut central committee.

A member of the Labor Party, she was elected to the Knesset on its list in 1992, and was appointed Deputy Minister of Industry and Trade. She lost her seat in the 1996 elections. In 1999 she joined Pnina Rosenblum's Tnufa party, and was third on its list for the elections that year. However, it failed to cross the electoral threshold.

References

External links

1936 births
People from Herzliya
Jews in Mandatory Palestine
Israeli educators
Israeli women educators
Israeli activists
Israeli women activists
Israeli trade unionists
Living people
Israeli Labor Party politicians
Women members of the Knesset
Members of the 13th Knesset (1992–1996)
Deputy ministers of Israel